Daniel, Danny or Dan Flynn may refer to:
Danny Flynn (printer) (born 1964), printer and designer
Danny Flynn (artist), English fantasy and science fiction artist
Danny Flynn (ice hockey) (born 1957), Canadian ice hockey coach
Daniel Flynn (actor) (born 1961), English television actor
Daniel Flynn (cricketer) (born 1985), New Zealand cricketer
Daniel Flynn (cyclist) (1884–1980), track cyclist who competed for Great Britain in the 1908 Summer Olympics
Daniel Flynn (footballer) (born 1994), former Australian rules footballer
Daniel J. Flynn, American author and columnist
Dan Flynn (politician) (1943–2022), member of the Texas House of Representatives
Dan Flynn (boxer) (1888–1946), American heavyweight boxer
Dan Flynn (soccer) (born 1955), CEO and Secretary General of U.S. Soccer (2000–2019)